The following is a list of mammals with non-domesticated populations in Norway.

Insectivores

Hedgehogs
European hedgehog, Erinaceus europaeus

Shrews
Eurasian water shrew, Neomys fodiens
Common shrew, Sorex araneus
Laxmann's shrew, Sorex caecutiens
Taiga shrew, Sorex isodon
Eurasian pygmy shrew, Sorex minutus
Eurasian least shrew, Sorex minutissimus

Bats 
Northern bat, Eptesicus nilssonii
Brandt's bat, Myotis brandtii
Daubenton's bat, Myotis daubentonii
Whiskered bat, Myotis mystacinus
Natterer's bat, Myotis nattereri
Common noctule, Nyctalus noctula
Nathusius's pipistrelle, Pipistrellus nathusii
Soprano pipistrelle, Pipistrellus pygmaeus
Brown long-eared bat, Plecotus auritus 
Parti-coloured bat, Vespertilio murinus

Lagomorphs 
European hare, Lepus europaeus
Mountain hare, Lepus timidus
European rabbit, Oryctolgaus cuniculus introduced

Rodents

Squirrels
Red squirrel, Sciurus vulgaris

Beavers
European beaver, Castor fiber

Muroids
Yellow-necked mouse, Apodemus flavicollis
Wood mouse, Apodemus sylvaticus
North-western water vole, Arvicola terrestris
Grey red-backed vole, Clethrionomys rufocanus
Bank vole, Clethrionomys glareolus
Northern red-backed vole, Clethrionomys rutilus
Norway lemming, Lemmus lemmus
Field vole, Microtus agrestis
Eurasian harvest mouse, Micromys minutus
Root vole, Microtus oeconomus
Sibling vole, Microtus rossiaemeridionalis (Svalbard only)
House mouse, Mus musculus
Wood lemming, Myopus schisticolor
Muskrat, Ondatra zibethicus introduced
Brown rat, Rattus norvegicus

Birch mice
Northern birch mouse, Sicista betulina

Cetaceans

Beaked whales
Northern bottlenose whale, Hyperoodon ampullatus
Sowerby's beaked whale, Mesoplodon bidens

White whales
White whale, Delphinapterus leucas 
Narwhal, Monodon monoceros

Sperm whales
Sperm whale, Physeter macrocephalus

Porpoises
Common porpoise, Phocoena phocoena

Dolphins
Short-beaked common dolphin, Delphinus delphi
Pilot whale, Globicephala melaena
Risso's dolphin, Grampus griseus
White-beaked dolphin, Lagenorhynchus albirostris
Atlantic white-sided dolphin, Lagenorhynchus acutus
Orca, Orcinus orca
Striped dolphin, Stenella coeruleoalba vagrant
Common bottlenose dolphin, Tursiops truncatus

Baleen whales
Bowhead whale, Balaena mysticetus
Minke whale, Balaenoptera acuturostrata
Sei whale, Balaenoptera borealis
Blue whale, Balaenoptera musculus
Fin whale, Balaenoptera physalis
North Atlantic right whale, Eubalaena glacialis vagrant
Humpback whale, Megaptera novaeangliae

Carnivorans

Canids
Gray wolf, Canis lupus
Raccoon dog, Nyctereutes procyonoides introduced
Arctic fox, Vulpes lagopus
Red fox, Vulpes vulpes

Bears
Brown bear, Ursus arctos
Polar bear, Ursus maritimus (Svalbard only)

Mustelids
Wolverine, Gulo gulo
Eurasian otter, Lutra lutra
Pine marten, Martes martes
European badger, Meles meles
Stoat, Mustela erminea
Least weasel, Mustela nivalis
European polecat, Mustela putorius
American mink, Neogale vison introduced

Cats
Eurasian lynx, Lynx lynx

Pinnipeds
Hooded seal, Cystophora cristata
Bearded seal, Erignatus barbatus 
Grey seal, Halichoerus grypus 
Walrus, Odobenus rosmarus 
Harp seal, Phoca groenlandica 
Ringed seal, Phoca hispida 
Common seal, Phoca vitulina

Even-toed ungulates

Pigs
Wild boar, Sus scrofa extirpated

Deer
Elk, Alces alces
Roe deer, Capreolus capreolus
Red deer, Cervus elaphus
European fallow deer, Dama dama introduced
Reindeer, Rangifer tarandus

Cattle
Musk ox, Ovibos moschatus reintroduced

Sources 
Atlas on mammals, by the Norwegian Zoological Society (in Norwegian)

See also 
List of European mammals
Norwegian Black List

References 

Norway
Mammals
Mammals
Norway